Irvine is a home rule-class city in Estill County, Kentucky, in the United States. It is the seat of its county. Its population was 2,715 at the time of the 2010 census.

Geography

Irvine is located in the center of Estill County at  (37.696835, -83.966895). The city limits are on the northeast side of the Kentucky River, and the city is bordered by Ravenna to the southeast.

History

It was named for Col. William Irvine, a pioneer settler of Madison County. The post office was established in 1813, and the city was incorporated by the state legislature in 1849.

Demographics

As of the census of 2000, there were 2,843 people, 1,259 households, and 793 families residing in the city. The racial makeup of the city was 99.26% White, 0.04% African American, 0.21% Native American, 0.04% from other races, and 0.46% from two or more races. Hispanic or Latino of any race were 0.56% of the population.

There were 1,259 households, out of which 26.9% had children under the age of 18 living with them, 42.7% were married couples living together, 17.2% had a female householder with no husband present, and 37.0% were non-families. 33.7% of all households were made up of individuals, and 17.5% had someone living alone who was 65 years of age or older. The average household size was 2.22 and the average family size was 2.82.

22.9% of the population was under the age of 18, 8.0% from 18 to 24, 27.7% from 25 to 44, 23.0% from 45 to 64, and 18.5% who were 65 years of age or older. The median age was 39 years. For every 100 females, there were 83.9 males. For every 100 females age 18 and over, there were 77.2 males.

The median income for a household in the city was $20,286, and the median income for a family was $25,046. Males had a median income of $28,988 versus $17,194 for females. The per capita income for the city was $14,075. About 20.9% of families and 28.2% of the population were below the poverty line, including 25.4% of those under age 18 and 22.0% of those age 65 or over.

Economy
Major employers include Carhartt. Mercy Health Partners operates Marcum and Wallace Memorial Hospital in Irvine.

Education
Irvine has a lending library, the Estill County Public Library.

References

External links
 Estill Development Alliance - Estill County Information
 Estill County Water District 1
 Mountain Mushroom Festival

cities in Estill County, Kentucky
county seats in Kentucky